Sarajevo may refer to:

 Sarajevo, capital and largest city of Bosnia and Herzegovina
 Istočno Sarajevo, city of Bosnia and Herzegovina
 Assassination of Archduke Franz Ferdinand of Austria,  an assassination placed in Sarajevo leading to World War I

Film
 Sarajevo (1940 French film), a 1940 French film directed by Max Ophüls
 Sarajevo (1940 Hungarian film), a Hungarian film directed by Ákos Ráthonyi 
 Sarajevo (1955 film), an Austrian film directed by Fritz Kortner
 Welcome to Sarajevo, a 1997 British film directed by Michael Winterbottom
 Sarajevo (2014 film), an Austrian film directed by Andreas Prochaska